Get Back is the fourth studio album released by the Canadian band Pink Mountaintops on April 28, 2014, through Jagjaguwar Records. It features a guest appearances by J. Mascis and Annie Hardy.

The album was a longlisted nominee for the 2014 Polaris Music Prize.

Track listing

References

2014 albums
Jagjaguwar albums
Pink Mountaintops albums